Mercenary is the sixth album by the British death metal band Bolt Thrower. It was recorded at Chapel Studios, Lincoln, England, December 1997 to January 1998. The album was produced by Bolt Thrower and Ewan Davis. It was released on Metal Blade Records in 1998.

The cover painting is titled "Contact – Wait Out", which is also the first track on the next album, Honour – Valour – Pride.

"Powder Burns" is a continuation of the song "Embers" from The IVth Crusade, and leads into "The Killchain" on Those Once Loyal.

This is the only album to feature Alex Thomas on drums.

Track listing
All songs written by Bolt Thrower

¹ Bonus track on digipak and Japanese version. The digipak edition contains 25 tracks of which tracks 10 to 24 are short tracks of silence.

Personnel
Bolt Thrower
 Karl Willetts – vocals
 Gavin Ward – rhythm guitar
 Barry Thomson – rhythm and lead guitar
 Jo Bench – Bass guitar
 Alex Thomas – drums

Production & Miscellaneous Credits
Arranged by Bolt Thrower
Produced by Ewan Davies & Bolt Thrower
Recorded & Engineered by Ewan Davies, except "Powder Burns" (recorded & engineered by James Anderson)
Peter Archer – Front cover: sketch for "Contact – Wait Out"
Jan Meininghaus – Eye motif
Paul McHale – Chaos skull

References

1998 albums
Bolt Thrower albums
Metal Blade Records albums